Kropotkin is an urban locality (a work settlement) in Bodaybinsky District of Irkutsk Oblast, Russia. Population: 

It was named Kropotkin (in honor of Peter Kropotkin) in 1930.

Administrative status
Kropotkin is the capital of the Kropotkin Urban Settlement (Кропоткинского муниципального образования) municipal unit, which includes the Kropotkin urban locality, as well as the village of Svetly.

Geography
The town lies on the Nygri River, a left tributary of the Vachi River, a tributary of the Zhuya of the Chara River basin.

References

Urban-type settlements in Irkutsk Oblast
Peter Kropotkin